Mark Hall may refer to:

People 
Mark Hall (musician) (born 1969), Casting Crowns member
Mark Hall (animator), producer of animated features
Mark Hall (American football), American football player
Mark Hall (wrestler) (born 1997), American wrestler 
Mark David Hall (born 1966), American scholar
Mark Hall (fighter) (born 1974), American mixed martial artist
Mark Hall (politician) (elected 2018), American politician from Tennessee

Other uses
Mark Hall Academy a school in Harlow, Essex, England
Mark Hall (Greenville, Georgia), listed on the NRHP in Meriwether County, Georgia

See also
Marc Hall, Canadian gay equality activist
Marc Hall (baseball), Major League Baseball pitcher
Marks Hall, a Jacobean country house near Coggeshall, Essex, England, demolished in 1950
Marks (manor house), near Romford, Essex, England, demolished in 1808